The 82nd Division was created in February 1949 under the Regulation of the Redesignations of All Organizations and Units of the Army, issued by Central Military Commission on November 1, 1948,. basing on the 28th Division, 10th Column of the Huadong Field Army. Its history can be traced to the 7th Division, Shandong Military Region, formed in August 1946.

The division was part of the 28th Corps. Under the flag of the 82nd Division, it was engaged in several major battles in the Chinese Civil War, including the Menglianggu Campaign, Laiwu Campaign, Jinan Campaign, Huaihai Campaign and Shanghai Campaign.

In October 1949, 244th Regiment, 82nd Division was eliminated during the Battle of Guningtou. In January 1950, 244th Regiment was reconstituted from the 302nd Regiment, 101st Division and the remnants of the 244th.

In July 1950, Artillery Regiment, 82nd Division was activated, which was later renamed as 362nd Artillery Regiment in 1953.

In 1958 the division took part in the shelling of Kinmen Islands.

In April 1960 the division was renamed as 82nd Army Division. It was then composed of:
244th Regiment
245th Regiment
246th Regiment
362nd Artillery Regiment

In November 1969, the division was redeployed to Hongdong, Shanxi along with the 28th Army Corps. In December 362nd Artillery Regiment was renamed as Artillery Regiment, 82nd Army Division.

In August 1985 the division was reconstituted as a northern infantry division, category B and renamed as the 82nd Infantry Division. The division was then stationed in Datong, Shanxi. The division was then composed of:
244th Infantry Regiment
245th Infantry Regiment
246th Infantry Regiment
Artillery Regiment

The division took part in the martial law enforcement and the crackdown on protests in Beijing in May and June 1989 along with the 28th Army Headquarters. On June 4, 1989, when marching eastward at Muxidi, the division was blocked by thousands of protesters. With the deliberate indulgence by its army commissar Zhang Mingchun(), and army commander He Yanran, soldiers from the division mutinied and moved against orders. The division failed to meet its objective in the incident.

In September 1998, the division was reduced as the 82nd Motorized Infantry Brigade and transferred to 63rd Army following 28th Army's disbandment.

In September 2003, the brigade was transferred to 27th Army following 63rd Army's disbandment.

In April 2017, the brigade was again transferred to 81st Army following 27th Army's disbandment. It was then reconstituted as 81st Special Operations Brigade(), as a functioning part of the 81st Army

References 

People's Liberation Army Ground Force